Aleksandr Panayotov Aleksandrov (born December 1, 1951) is a retired Bulgarian cosmonaut. He is the second Bulgarian to have flown to space, behind Georgi Ivanov.

Biography

Aleksandrov was born in Omurtag, Bulgaria on December 1, 1951. He graduated from the Bulgarian Air Force Academy in 1974 and obtained a degree in technical sciences in 1983. In the Bulgarian Air Force, Aleksandrov rose to the rank of lieutenant colonel.

Aleksandrov was selected as a Research Cosmonaut on March 1, 1978, as part of the Soviet Union's Intercosmos program. The selection featured six semifinalists, including the parachute jump record holder, Chavdar Djurov, who was killed during the selection process. Aleksandrov was selected as backup to Georgi Ivanov on the Soyuz 33 mission to the Salyut 6 space station. Subsequently, Aleksandrov was assigned to the prime crew of the Soyuz TM-5 mission to the Mir space station.

On June 7, 1988, Aleksandrov launched aboard TM-5 as a Research Cosmonaut along with mission commander Anatoly Solovyev and Viktor Savinykh. Upon arriving at Mir, Aleksandrov became the first Bulgarian to reach a Soviet space station, as the Soyuz 33 mission carrying Georgi Ivanov failed to reach the Salyut 6 space station. On June 17, Aleksandrov returned aboard Soyuz TM-4 along with his fellow crew members. He, along with his crew-mates, spent just under 10 days in space.

Aleksandrov later became Deputy Director of the Institute of Space Research, Bulgarian Academy of Sciences.

Currently Aleksandrov works as a research scientist. He is married and has one child.

Honours and awards
 Hero of the People's Republic of Bulgaria (1988)
 Hero of the Soviet Union (1988)
 Order of Georgi Dimitrov
 Order of Lenin (1988)
 Order of Stara Planina (2003), first class, on the 15th anniversary of the second Soviet-Bulgarian flight
 Military Pilot First Class
 Pilot-Cosmonaut of Bulgaria
 Medal "For Merit in Space Exploration" (12 April 2011) – for outstanding contribution to the development of international cooperation in manned space flight

See also
Bulgarian cosmonaut program

References

External links

Spacefacts biography of Aleksandar Panayotov Aleksandrov

1951 births
Living people
People from Omurtag (town)
Bulgarian cosmonauts
Heroes of the Soviet Union
Heroes of the People's Republic of Bulgaria
Recipients of the Order of Georgi Dimitrov
Recipients of the Order of Lenin
Bulgarian Air Force personnel
20th-century Bulgarian military personnel
Mir crew members